is the Japanese word for writing style and typeface. Shotai covers the calligraphic writing styles, such as:

 regular script,
 seal script,
 clerical script,
 running script, and
 cursive script

as well as Japanese styles like

 Edomoji

It also includes Japanese typefaces such as
 Minchō and
 Gothic

Examples

See also
POP (Point of Purchase typeface)

External links
Terms Used in Font Information Processing (in Japanese)

Japanese language
CJK typefaces